THV may refer to:

 Tetrahydrocannabivarin
 The Horsemen's Voice
 Trinity House Vessel, ship prefix
 Tetrafluoroethylene / Hexafluoropropylene / Vinylidene fluoride copolymer
 Terrestrial Herbaceous Vegetation: principally piths and leaves, are fallback foods for the great apes